Hemasiri Dhanawatha Liyanage  (born December 25, 1942), is an actor in Sri Lankan cinema, theater, and television. He is well known for the dramatic roles in Thattu Gewal and Thaththa teledramas and films Sankranthi, Sthuthi Nawatha Enna and Madhura Charika.

Personal life
Hemasiri Liyanage was born on 25 December 1942 in Nahalla village, Bulathsinhala as the third of the family with four siblings. He has one elder brother, one elder sister and one younger brother. He completed education from Vidyarathana College, Horana. He is married to Kusuma Liyanage, who is a cousin sister. She is also a retired teacher.

He also is the father of four sons - Saumya, Saman, Aloka and Indrachapa. Eldest son Saumya Liyanage is an actor and a lecturer. Second son Saman is an artist. Third son Aloka Liyanage is a doctor. He was married to the Madhavee Wathsala,  daughter of actor Jackson Anthony, until divorce in 2016. Youngest son Indrachapa Liyanage is a renowned rock musician who is married to fellow actress Samanalee Fonseka.

Career
He was selected to University of Kelaniya in 1964 and graduated with an arts degree. He formed the drama organization in the university known as National Drama Corporation. After graduating, he started teaching at Vidyarathana College, Horana. In 1980, he lost the job due to political disputes within the country. He taught economics to A/L students and taught drama as an additional subject. While in the school, he produced the stage drama Nadagam Hewath Sudu Atha Awata Passe in 1969. The drama won the second place in Inter-school drama competition with a controversy. In 1975, Liyanage produced the play Nariya Saha Keju and in 1975 Vijaya Nandasiri and Hemasiri were presented with awards for Best Production and Best Music at the National Drama Festival. His final stage drama production was Chithrage Prema Kathwa staged in 1982.

He started drama career as a playwright and producer in stage dramas such as Kanakok Suda staged in 1967. He acted as the lead actor in that drama as well. Then he acted in the play Balal Hasthaya produced by Rohana Beddage.

He started cinema career with the 1983 film Niliyakata Pem Kalemi directed by Siri Kularathna. Her notable cinema came through Aswesuma, Sankranthi, Sthuthi Nawatha Enna, Madhura Charika and Sansare Dadayakkaraya.

Selected television serials

 Amba Yahaluvo 
 Amuthu Minissu
 Anantha
 Asalwasiyo
 Athuru Paara
 Ayal 
 Chakraudhaya 
 Dahas Gawdura
 Dambulugala Sakmana 
 Eka Iththaka Mal 
 Girikula
 Idorayaka Mal Pipila
 Jeewithaya Dakinna 
 Kadathira 
 Kampitha Vil
 Kasee Salu 
 Kethumathi Neyo 
 Kokila Sandwaniya
 Kulawamiya
 Mayaratne
 Mayavi 
 Meedum Amma
 Minigan Dela
 Mini Palanga 
 Ramya Suramya
 Pinketha
 Podu
 Sanda Dev Diyani 
 Sandagira 
 Sindu Kiyana Una Pandura
 Sisila Ima
 Suwanda Yahaluwo
 Thanamalvila Kollek 
 Thaththa
 Thattu Gewal
 Wanawadule Wasanthaya

Filmography

Awards and accolades

Raigam Tele'es

|-
|| 2018 ||| Contribution to cinema || Special Tribute ||

References

External links

මාධ්‍යයට මාව වටින්නේ නැතුව ඇති
Ever shared a naked picture? The Grassrooted Trust presents V Day from The Cloud

Sri Lankan male film actors
Sri Lankan male television actors
Sinhalese male actors
1942 births
Living people